Michaelophorus shafferi is a species of moth in the genus Michaelophorus known from Brazil.

References

Platyptiliini
Moths described in 1999
Endemic fauna of Brazil
Moths of South America